The Hawaii hotspot  is a volcanic hotspot located near the namesake Hawaiian Islands, in the northern Pacific Ocean. One of the best known and intensively studied hotspots in the world, the Hawaii plume is responsible for the creation of the Hawaiian–Emperor seamount chain, a  mostly undersea volcanic mountain range. Four of these volcanoes are active, two are dormant; more than 123 are extinct, most now preserved as atolls or seamounts. The chain extends from south of the island of Hawaii to the edge of the Aleutian Trench, near the eastern coast of Russia.

While most volcanoes are created by geological activity at tectonic plate boundaries, the Hawaii hotspot is located far from plate boundaries. The classic hotspot theory, first proposed in 1963 by John Tuzo Wilson, proposes that a single, fixed mantle plume builds volcanoes that then, cut off from their source by the movement of the Pacific Plate, become increasingly inactive and eventually erode below sea level over millions of years. According to this theory, the nearly 60° bend where the Emperor and Hawaiian segments of the chain meet was caused by a sudden shift in the movement of the Pacific Plate. In 2003, fresh investigations of this irregularity led to the proposal of a mobile hotspot theory, suggesting that hotspots are mobile, not fixed, and that the 47-million-year-old bend was caused by a shift in the hotspot's motion rather than the plate's.

Ancient Hawaiians were the first to recognize the increasing age and weathered state of the volcanoes to the north as they progressed on fishing expeditions along the islands. The volatile state of the Hawaiian volcanoes and their constant battle with the sea was a major element in Hawaiian mythology, embodied in Pele, the deity of volcanoes. After the arrival of Europeans on the island, in 1880–1881 James Dwight Dana directed the first formal geological study of the hotspot's volcanics, confirming the relationship long observed by the natives. The Hawaiian Volcano Observatory was founded in 1912 by volcanologist Thomas Jaggar, initiating continuous scientific observation of the islands. In the 1970s, a mapping project was initiated to gain more information about the complex geology of Hawaii's seafloor.

In its at least 85 million years of activity the hotspot has produced an estimated  of rock.

Theories

Tectonic plates generally focus deformation and volcanism at plate boundaries.

Wilson's stationary hotspot theory

Wilson proposed that mantle convection produces small, hot, buoyant upwellings under the Earth's surface; these thermally active mantle plumes supply magma which in turn sustains long-lasting volcanic activity. This "mid-plate" volcanism builds peaks that rise from relatively featureless sea floor, initially as seamounts and later as fully-fledged volcanic islands. The local tectonic plate (in the case of the Hawaii hotspot, the Pacific Plate) gradually passes over the hotspot, carrying its volcanoes with it without affecting the plume. Over hundreds of thousands of years, the magma supply for an individual volcano is slowly cut off, eventually causing its extinction. No longer active enough to overpower erosion, the volcano slowly recedes beneath the waves, becoming a seamount once again. As the cycle continues, a new volcanic center pierces the crust, and a volcanic island arises anew. The process continues until the mantle plume itself collapses.

This cycle of growth and dormancy strings together volcanoes over millions of years, leaving a trail of volcanic islands and seamounts across the ocean floor. According to Wilson's theory, the Hawaiian volcanoes should be progressively older and increasingly eroded the further they are from the hotspot, and this is easily observable; the oldest rock in the main Hawaiian islands, that of Kauai, is about 5.5 million years old and deeply eroded, while the rock on Hawaii island is a comparatively young 0.7 million years of age or less, with new lava constantly erupting at Kīlauea, the hotspot's present center. Another consequence of his theory is that the chain's length and orientation serves to record the direction and speed of the Pacific Plate's movement. A major feature of the Hawaiian trail is a "sudden" 60-degree bend at a 40- to 50-million-year-old section of its length, and according to Wilson's theory, this is evidence of a major change in plate direction, one that would have initiated subduction along much of the Pacific Plate's western boundary. This part of the theory has recently been challenged, and the bend might be attributed to the movement of the hotspot itself.

A mantle plume would initiate at the interface when the warmer lower layer heats a portion of the cooler upper layer. This heated, buoyant, and less-viscous portion of the upper layer would become less dense due to thermal expansion, and rise towards the surface as a Rayleigh-Taylor instability. When the mantle plume reaches the base of the lithosphere, the plume heats it and produces melt. This magma then makes its way to the surface, where it is erupted as lava.

Arguments for the validity of the hotspot theory generally center on the steady age progression of the Hawaiian islands and nearby features: a similar bend in the trail of the Macdonald hotspot, the Austral–Marshall Islands seamount chain, located just south;
other Pacific hotspots following the same age-progressed trend from southeast to northwest in fixed relative positions; and seismologic studies of Hawaii which show increased temperatures at the core–mantle boundary, evidencing a mantle plume.

Shallow hotspot hypothesis

Another hypothesis is that melting anomalies form as a result of lithospheric extension, which allows pre-existing melt to rise to the surface. These melting anomalies are normally called "hotspots", but under the shallow-source hypothesis the mantle underlying them is not anomalously hot. In the case of the Hawaiian–Emperor seamount chain, the Pacific plate boundary system was very different around 80 Mya, when the Emperor seamount chain began to form. There is evidence that the chain started on a spreading ridge (the Pacific-Kula Ridge) that has now been subducted at the Aleutian trench. The locus of melt extraction may have migrated off the ridge and into the plate interior, leaving a trail of volcanism behind it. This migration may have occurred because this part of the plate was extending in order to accommodate intraplate stress. Thus, a long-lived region of melt escape could have been sustained. Supporters of this hypothesis argue that the wavespeed anomalies seen in seismic tomographic studies cannot be reliably interpreted as hot upwellings originating in the lower mantle.

Moving hotspot theory
The most heavily challenged element of Wilson's theory is whether hotspots are indeed fixed relative to the overlying tectonic plates. In 1987, a study published by Peter Molnar and Joann Stock found that the hotspot does move relative to the Pacific Ocean; however, they interpreted this as the result of the relative motions of the North American and Pacific plates rather than that of the hotspot itself.

In 2001 the Ocean Drilling Program (since merged into the Integrated Ocean Drilling Program), an international research effort to study the world's seafloors, funded a two-month expedition aboard the research vessel JOIDES Resolution to collect lava samples from four submerged Emperor seamounts. The project drilled Detroit, Nintoku, and Koko seamounts, all of which are in the far northwest end of the chain, the oldest section. These lava samples were then tested in 2003, suggesting a mobile Hawaiian hotspot and a shift in its motion as the cause of the bend. Lead scientist John Tarduno told National Geographic:
The Hawaii bend was used as a classic example of how a large plate can change motion quickly. You can find a diagram of the Hawaii–Emperor bend entered into just about every introductory geological textbook out there. It really is something that catches your eye."

Despite the large shift, the change in direction was never recorded by magnetic declinations, fracture zone orientations or plate reconstructions; nor could a continental collision have occurred fast enough to produce such a pronounced bend in the chain. To test whether the bend was a result of a change in direction of the Pacific Plate, scientists analyzed the lava samples' geochemistry to determine where and when they formed. Age was determined by the radiometric dating of radioactive isotopes of potassium and argon. Researchers estimated that the volcanoes formed during a period 81 million to 45 million years ago. Tarduno and his team determined where the volcanoes formed by analyzing the rock for the magnetic mineral magnetite. While hot lava from a volcanic eruption cools, tiny grains within the magnetite align with the Earth's magnetic field, and lock in place once the rock solidifies. Researchers were able to verify the latitudes at which the volcanoes formed by measuring the grains' orientation within the magnetite. Paleomagnetists concluded that the Hawaiian hotspot had drifted southward sometime in its history, and that, 47 million years ago, the hotspot's southward motion greatly slowed, perhaps even stopping entirely.

History of study

Ancient Hawaiians

The possibility that the Hawaiian islands became older as one moved to the northwest was suspected by ancient Hawaiians long before Europeans arrived. During their voyages, seafaring Hawaiians noticed differences in erosion, soil formation, and vegetation, allowing them to deduce that the islands to the northwest (Niihau and Kauai) were older than those to the southeast (Maui and Hawaii). The idea was handed down the generations through the legend of Pele, the Hawaiian goddess of volcanoes.

Pele was born to the female spirit Haumea, or Hina, who, like all Hawaiian gods and goddesses, descended from the supreme beings, Papa, or Earth Mother, and Wakea, or Sky Father. According to the myth, Pele originally lived on Kauai, when her older sister Nāmaka, the Goddess of the Sea, attacked her for seducing her husband. Pele fled southeast to the island of Oahu. When forced by Nāmaka to flee again, Pele moved southeast to Maui and finally to Hawaii, where she still lives in Halemaʻumaʻu at the summit of Kīlauea. There she was safe, because the slopes of the volcano are so high that even Nāmaka's mighty waves could not reach her. Pele's mythical flight, which alludes to an eternal struggle between volcanic islands and ocean waves, is consistent with geologic evidence about the ages of the islands decreasing to the southeast.

Modern studies

Three of the earliest recorded observers of the volcanoes were the Scottish scientists Archibald Menzies in 1794, James Macrae in 1825, and David Douglas in 1834. Just reaching the summits proved daunting: Menzies took three attempts to ascend Mauna Loa, and Douglas died on the slopes of Mauna Kea. The United States Exploring Expedition spent several months studying the islands in 1840–1841. American geologist James Dwight Dana was on that expedition, as was Lieutenant Charles Wilkes, who spent most of the time leading a team of hundreds that hauled a pendulum to the summit of Mauna Loa to measure gravity. Dana stayed with missionary Titus Coan, who would provide decades of first-hand observations. Dana published a short paper in 1852.

Dana remained interested in the origin of the Hawaiian Islands, and directed a more in-depth study in 1880 and 1881. He confirmed that the islands' age increased with their distance from the southeasternmost island by observing differences in their degree of erosion. He also suggested that many other island chains in the Pacific showed a similar general increase in age from southeast to northwest. Dana concluded that the Hawaiian chain consisted of two volcanic strands, located along distinct but parallel curving pathways. He coined the terms "Loa" and "Kea" for the two prominent trends. The Kea trend includes the volcanoes of Kīlauea, Mauna Kea, Kohala, Haleakalā, and West Maui. The Loa trend includes Lōihi, Mauna Loa, Hualālai, Kahoolawe, Lānai, and West Molokai. Dana proposed that the alignment of the Hawaiian Islands reflected localized volcanic activity along a major fissure zone. Dana's "great fissure" theory served as the working hypothesis for subsequent studies until the mid-20th century.

Dana's work was followed up by the 1884 expedition of geologist C. E. Dutton, who refined and expanded Dana's ideas. Most notably, Dutton established that the island of Hawaii actually harbored five volcanoes, whereas Dana counted three. This is because Dana had originally regarded Kīlauea as a flank vent of Mauna Loa, and Kohala as part of Mauna Kea. Dutton also refined others of Dana's observations, and is credited with the naming of 'a'ā and pāhoehoe-type lavas, although Dana had also noted a distinction. Stimulated by Dutton's expedition, Dana returned in 1887, and published many accounts of his expedition in the American Journal of Science. In 1890 he published the most detailed manuscript of its day, which remained the definitive guide to Hawaiian volcanism for decades. In 1909 two major books about Hawaii's volcanoes were published ("The volcanoes of Kilauea and Mauna Loa" by W.T. Brigham and "Hawaii and its volcanoes" by C.H. Hitchcock).

In 1912 geologist Thomas Jaggar founded the Hawaiian Volcano Observatory. The facility was taken over in 1919 by the National Oceanic and Atmospheric Administration and in 1924 by the United States Geological Survey (USGS), which marked the start of continuous volcano observation on Hawaii island. The next century was a period of thorough investigation, marked by contributions from many top scientists. The first complete evolutionary model was first formulated in 1946, by USGS geologist and hydrologist Harold T. Stearns. Since that time, advances (e.g. improved rock dating methods and submarine volcanic stages) have enabled the study of previously limited areas of observation.

In the 1970s, the Hawaiian seafloor was mapped using ship-based sonar. Computed SYNBAPS (Synthetic Bathymetric Profiling System) data filled gaps between the ship-based sonar bathymetric measurements. From 1994 to 1998 the Japan Agency for Marine-Earth Science and Technology (JAMSTEC) mapped Hawaii in detail and studied its ocean floor, making it one of the world's best-studied marine features. The JAMSTEC project, a collaboration with USGS and other agencies, employed manned submersibles, remotely operated underwater vehicles, dredge samples, and core samples. The Simrad EM300 multibeam  side-scanning sonar system collected bathymetry and backscatter data.

Characteristics

Position
These low seismic velocity zones often indicate hotter and more buoyant mantle material, consistent with a plume originating in the lower mantle and a pond of plume material in the upper mantle. The low-velocity zone associated with the source of the plume is north of Hawaii, showing that the plume is tilted to a certain degree, deflected toward the south by mantle flow.

Temperature 
Indirect studies found that the magma chamber is located about  underground, which matches the estimated depth of the Cretaceous Period rock in the oceanic lithosphere; this may indicate that the lithosphere acts as a lid on melting by arresting the magma's ascent. The magma's original temperature was found in two ways, by testing garnet's melting point in lava and by adjusting the lava for olivine deterioration.

The surface heat flow anomaly around the Hawaiian Swell is only of the order of 10 mW/m2, far less than the continental United States range of 25–150 mW/m2. This is unexpected for the classic model of a hot, buoyant plume in the mantle. However, it has been shown that other plumes display highly variable surface heat fluxes and that this variability may be due to variable hydrothermal fluid flow in the Earth's crust above the hotspots. This fluid flow advectively removes heat from the crust, and the measured conductive heat flow is therefore lower than the true total surface heat flux. The low heat across the Hawaiian Swell indicates that it is not supported by a buoyant crust or upper lithosphere, but is rather propped up by the upwelling hot (and therefore less-dense) mantle plume that causes the surface to rise through a mechanism known as "dynamic topography".

Movement
Hawaiian volcanoes drift northwest from the hotspot at a rate of about  a year. The hotspot has migrated south by about  relative to the Emperor chain. Paleomagnetic studies support this conclusion based on changes in Earth's magnetic field, a picture of which was engrained in the rocks at the time of their solidification, showing that these seamounts formed at higher latitudes than present-day Hawaii. The Ocean Drilling Program provided most of the current knowledge about the drift. The 2001 expedition drilled six seamounts and tested the samples to determine their original latitude, and thus the characteristics and speed of the hotspot's drift pattern in total.

Each successive volcano spends less time actively attached to the plume. The large difference between the youngest and oldest lavas between Emperor and Hawaiian volcanoes indicates that the hotspot's velocity is increasing. For example, Kohala, the oldest volcano on Hawaii island, is one million years old and last erupted 120,000 years ago, a period of just under 900,000 years; whereas one of the oldest, Detroit Seamount, experienced 18 million or more years of volcanic activity.

The oldest volcano in the chain, Meiji Seamount, perched on the edge of the Aleutian Trench, formed 85 million years ago. At its current velocity, the seamount will be destroyed within a few million years, as the Pacific Plate slides under the Eurasian Plate. It is unknown whether the seamount chain has been subducting under the Eurasian Plate, and whether the hotspot is older than Meiji Seamount, as any older seamounts have since been destroyed by the plate margin. It is also possible that a collision near the Aleutian Trench had changed the velocity of the Pacific Plate, explaining the hotspot chain's bend; the relationship between these features is still being investigated.

Magma

The composition of the volcanoes' magma has changed significantly according to analysis of the strontium–niobium–palladium elemental ratios. The Emperor Seamounts were active for at least 46 million years, with the oldest lava dated to the Cretaceous Period, followed by another 39 million years of activity along the Hawaiian segment of the chain, totaling 85 million years. Data demonstrate vertical variability in the amount of strontium present in both the alkalic (early stages) and tholeiitic (later stages) lavas. The systematic increase slows drastically at the time of the bend.

Almost all magma created by the hotspot is igneous basalt; the volcanoes are constructed almost entirely of this or the similar in composition but coarser-grained gabbro and diabase. Other igneous rocks such as nephelinite are present in small quantities; these occur often on the older volcanoes, most prominently Detroit Seamount. Most eruptions are runny because basaltic magma is less viscous than magmas characteristic of more explosive eruptions such as the andesitic magmas that produce spectacular and dangerous eruptions around Pacific Basin margins. Volcanoes fall into several eruptive categories. Hawaiian volcanoes are called "Hawaiian-type". Hawaiian lava spills out of craters and forms long streams of glowing molten rock, flowing down the slope, covering acres of land and replacing ocean with new land.

Eruptive frequency and scale

There is significant evidence that lava flow rates have been increasing. The rate was almost zero for the initial five million or so years in the hotspot's life.

The distance between individual volcanoes has shrunk. Although volcanoes have been drifting north faster and spending less time active, the far greater modern eruptive volume of the hotspot has generated more closely spaced volcanoes, and many of them overlap, forming such superstructures as Hawaii island and the ancient Maui Nui.

Topography and geoid
A detailed topographic analysis of the Hawaiian–Emperor seamount chain reveals the hotspot as the center of a topographic high, and that elevation falls with distance from the hotspot. The most rapid decrease in elevation and the highest ratio between the topography and geoid height are over the southeastern part of the chain, falling with distance from the hotspot, particularly at the intersection of the Molokai and Murray fracture zones. The most likely explanation is that the region between the two zones is more susceptible to reheating than most of the chain. Another possible explanation is that the hotspot strength swells and subsides over time.

In 1953, Robert S. Dietz and his colleagues first identified the swell behavior. It was suggested that the cause was mantle upwelling. Later work pointed to tectonic uplift, caused by reheating within the lower lithosphere. However, normal seismic activity beneath the swell, as well as lack of detected heat flow, caused scientists to suggest dynamic topography as the cause, in which the motion of the hot and buoyant mantle plume supports the high surface topography around the islands. Understanding the Hawaiian swell has important implications for hotspot study, island formation, and inner Earth.

Seismicity
The Hawaii hotspot is a highly active seismic zone with thousands of earthquakes occurring on and near Hawaii island every year. Most are too small to be felt by people but some are large enough to result in minor to moderate devastation. The most destructive recorded earthquake was the 2 April 1868 earthquake which had a magnitude of 7.9 on the Richter scale. A tsunami claimed 46 more lives. The villages of Punaluu, Nīnole, Kaaawa, Honuapo, and Keauhou Landing were severely damaged.

Volcanoes

Over its 85 million year history, the Hawaii hotspot has created at least 129 volcanoes, more than 123 of which are extinct volcanoes, seamounts, and atolls, four of which are active volcanoes, and two of which are dormant volcanoes. They can be organized into three general categories: the Hawaiian archipelago, which comprises most of the U.S. state of Hawaii and is the location of all modern volcanic activity; the Northwestern Hawaiian Islands, which consist of coral atolls, extinct islands, and atoll islands; and the Emperor Seamounts, all of which have since eroded and subsided to the sea and become seamounts and guyots (flat-topped seamounts).

Volcanic characteristics 

Hawaiian volcanoes are characterized by frequent rift eruptions, their large size (thousands of cubic kilometers in volume), and their rough, decentralized shape. Rift zones are a prominent feature on these volcanoes, and account for their seemingly random volcanic structure. Hawaii is surrounded by a myriad of seamounts; however, they were found to be unconnected to the hotspot and its volcanism. Kīlauea has erupted continuously since 1983 through Puʻu ʻŌʻō, a minor volcanic cone, which has become an attraction for volcanologists and tourists alike.

Landslides
The Hawaiian islands are carpeted by a large number of landslides sourced from volcanic collapse. These debris flows can be sorted into two broad categories: slumps, mass movement over slopes which slowly flatten their originators, and more catastrophic debris avalanches, which fragment volcanic slopes and scatter volcanic debris past their slopes. These slides have caused massive tsunamis and earthquakes, fractured volcanic massifs, and scattered debris hundreds of miles away from their source. Active slumping is currently taking place on the south flank of the Big Island, where the Hilina Slump comprises a mobile portion of the island’s mass south of Kīlauea.

Forced forward by the mass of newly ejected volcanic material, slumps may creep forward slowly, or surge forward in spasms that have caused the largest of Hawaii's historical earthquakes, in 1868 and 1975. Debris avalanches, meanwhile, are thinner and longer, and are defined by volcanic amphitheaters at their head and hummocky terrain at their base. Rapidly moving avalanches carried  blocks tens of kilometers away, disturbing the local water column and causing a tsunami. Evidence of these events exists in the form of marine deposits high on the slopes of many Hawaiian volcanoes, and has marred the slopes of several Emperor seamounts, such as Daikakuji Guyot and Detroit Seamount.

Evolution and construction

Hawaiian volcanoes follow a well-established life cycle of growth and erosion. After a new volcano forms, its lava output gradually increases. Height and activity both peak when the volcano is around 500,000 years old and then rapidly decline. Eventually it goes dormant, and eventually extinct. Erosion then weathers the volcano until it again becomes a seamount.

This life cycle consists of several stages. The first stage is the submarine preshield stage, currently represented solely by Kama‘ehuakanaloa. During this stage, the volcano builds height through increasingly frequent eruptions. The sea's pressure prevents explosive eruptions. The cold water quickly solidifies the lava, producing the pillow lava that is typical of underwater volcanic activity.

As the seamount slowly grows, it goes through the shield stages. It forms many mature features, such as a caldera, while submerged. The summit eventually breaches the surface, and the lava and ocean water "battle" for control as the volcano enters the explosive subphase. This stage of development is exemplified by explosive steam vents. This stage produces mostly volcanic ash, a result of the waves dampening the lava. This conflict between lava and sea influences Hawaiian mythology.

The volcano enters the subaerial subphase once it is tall enough to escape the water. Now the volcano puts on 95% of its above-water height over roughly 500,000 years. Thereafter eruptions become much less explosive. The lava released in this stage often includes both pāhoehoe and ʻaʻā, and the currently active Hawaiian volcanoes, Mauna Loa and Kīlauea, are in this phase. Hawaiian lava is often runny, blocky, slow, and relatively easy to predict; the USGS tracks where it is most likely to run, and maintains a tourist site for viewing the lava.

After the subaerial phase the volcano enters a series of postshield stages involving subsidence and erosion, becoming an atoll and eventually a seamount. Once the Pacific Plate moves it out of the  tropics, the reef mostly dies away, and the extinct volcano becomes one of an estimated 10,000 barren seamounts worldwide. Every Emperor seamount is a dead volcano.

See also

 List of volcanic hotspots
 List of volcanoes in the Pacific Ocean
 List of volcanoes in the United States
 Maui Nui
 Types of volcanic eruptions

References

External links

 Pele — Goddess of Fire: Details Pele's full story, according to Hawaiian myths.
 The long trail of the Hawaiian hotspot: USGS article on the Hawaiian island chain.
 Evolution of Hawaiian Volcanoes: USGS article on the evolution of Hawaiian volcanoes over time.
 

Hotspots of the Pacific Ocean
Geology of Hawaii
Hawaiian–Emperor seamount chain
Volcanism of Hawaii
Volcanism of Oceania
Seismic zones of the United States